Thado Dhamma Yaza II (1520s–1588) was viceroy of Prome (Pyay) from 1551 to 1588, during the reigns of kings Bayinnaung and Nanda of Toungoo Dynasty of Burma (Myanmar). Having begun his military career in the service of King Tabinshwehti, the youngest full brother of Bayinnaung was part of the small core group loyal to Bayinnaung, following the assassination of Tabinshwehti in 1550. Alongside his brothers Bayinnaung, Minye Sithu, Minkhaung II, Thado Minsaw and his nephew Nanda, he fought in nearly every campaign between 1550 and 1584 that rebuilt, expanded and defended the Toungoo Empire.

Early life
He was born in the Toungoo Palace precincts to Mingyi Swe and Shin Myo Myat, royal household servants of Crown Prince Tabinshwehti. He had an elder sister, Dhamma Dewi, two elder brothers, Bayinnaung and Minye Sithu, and two younger half-brothers, Minkhaung II and Thado Minsaw who were born to his aunt (his mother's younger sister) and his father. He grew up in the palace precincts, and received a military-style education there.

Career

Tabinshwehti era (1534–1550)
He participated in the Toungoo–Hanthawaddy War (1534–1541), and by 1540 had achieved the rank of regimental commander with the style of Nanda Yawda. He was appointed governor of Thamyindon in the Irrawaddy delta in 1541 by Tabinshwehti. He served as a regimental commander in Toungoo's campaigns against Prome (1541–1542), led a naval squadron in the Arakan campaign (1546–1547), and commanded an elephant battalion in the invasion of Siam (1548–1549). In January 1550, he joined his brothers Bayinnaung and Minye Sithu on the campaign to suppress the rebellion of Smim Htaw.

Bayinnaung era (1550–1581)
He was a key member of Bayinnaung's drive to restore the Toungoo Empire which had fallen apart after Tabinshwehti was assassinated on 30 April 1550. He led a regiment in Bayinnaung's 1550–1551 assault on the city of Toungoo, whose ruler Minkhaung II was their own half-brother. He was given a royal title of Thado Dhamma Yaza on 11 January 1551 by Bayinnaung after Minkhaung II surrendered and was pardoned on the same day. He commanded the Irrawaddy flank in the Prome campaign (March–August 1551). Prome was taken on 30 August 1551, and Bayinnaung appointed him as the viceroy of Prome.

Thado Dhamma Yaza II was one of the four deputies of Bayinnaung in the king's campaigns between 1552 and 1565 that greatly expanded the Toungoo Empire. The original four were Bayinnaung's four brothers: Minye Sithu, Thado Dhamma Yaza, Minkhaung and Thado Minsaw. After Minye Sithu's death in 1556, Bayinnaung's eldest son Nanda took his place. Thado Dhamma Yaza participated in every campaign except for Manipur (1560) and Lan Xang (1565). Bayinnaung had built the largest empire in the history of Southeast Asia. After a brief respite, he faced serious rebellions in Lan Xang and Siam in 1568, later joined by northern Shan states in the 1570s. Thado Dhamma Yaza along with the other three deputies of the king were called upon to suppress the rebellions.

The following is a list of campaigns in which he participated during the reign of Bayinnaung.

He proved to be a loyal brother. He built the Prome gate of Pegu (Bago) when the capital was rebuilt between 1565 and 1568. (Each of the twenty gates of the new capital was built by key vassal rulers.) For their loyal service, Thado Dhamma Yaza II, Minkhaung II and Thado Minsaw were all honored by their brother the king on 3 March 1580.

Nanda era (1581–1588)
Bayinnaung died on 10 October 1581, and was succeeded by his son Nanda. The new king faced an impossible task of maintaining an empire ruled by autonomous viceroys who were loyal to Bayinnaung, not the kingdom of Toungoo. Nanda particularly distrusted his uncle Thado Minsaw of Ava. When two Chinese Shan states Sanda and Thaungthut revolted in August/September 1582, the high king asked Thado Dhamma Yaza II and Nawrahta Minsaw of Lan Na to lead two 8000-strong armies to quell the rebellion. (The king conspicuously did not ask Thado Minsaw to take part in the campaign although Ava contributed troops and the Shan states were closer to Ava.) The two armies laid siege to Sanda (present-day Baoshan prefecture) for nearly five months until the starving city surrendered. The armies arrived back to Pegu in April 1583.

Nanda's slight of Thado Minsaw did not go unnoticed. In June/July 1583, Thado Minsaw sent secret embassies to Prome, Toungoo and Chiang Mai to launch a simultaneous revolt against Nanda. He also sent missions to Shan states for their support. Thado Dhamma Yaza and the other viceroys sided with Nanda. When Nanda marched to Ava in March 1584, he along with the rulers of Toungoo and Chiang Mai also marched to Ava. Ava turned out to be Thado Dhamma Yaza's last campaign. He did not participate in the ensuing campaigns against Siam, which revolted in May 1584.

Thado Dhamma Yaza II died in November/December 1588. He was succeeded by Mingyi Hnaung, one of Nanda's sons, styled as Thado Dhamma Yaza III of Prome.

Family
His chief queen was Salin Mibaya, who was a daughter of King Bayin Htwe of Prome and a descendant of Ava royalty. They were married in 1545 in Pegu at the coronation ceremony of Tabinshwehti. He had two daughters by his chief queen. The elder daughter Hsinbyushin Medaw became the chief queen of Nawrahta Minsaw, the viceroy (and later king) of Lan Na. The younger daughter Min Taya Medaw was a major queen of Nanda.

He also had seven sons and a daughter by minor queens and concubines. They were:
 Nanda Yawda (birth name Shin Zin), who married his first cousin Myat Myo Hpone Wai (daughter of Bayinnaung) and became governor of Sagaing. Captured and brought to Mrauk-U in 1600 where he was given the title of Minye Theinkhathu.
 Min Shwe Myat, governor of Taingda
 Minye Uzana, governor of Salin
 Princess of Saku
 Governor of Malun, captured and sent to Arakan
 Shin Ne Myo, killed by Yan Naing in 1597
 Shin Ne Tun, killed by Yan Naing in 1597
 Pyinsa Thiha, governor of Moulmein

Notes

References

Bibliography
 
 
 
 

First Toungoo Empire
1520s births
1588 deaths
Year of birth unknown